Raúl García de Haro (born 3 November 2000) is a Spanish professional footballer who plays as a forward for CD Mirandés, on loan from Real Betis.

Club career 
Born in Olesa de Montserrat, Barcelona, Catalonia, García was raised in Guadix, Granada, Andalusia, and joined Guadix CF's youth setup in 2009. In 2013 he moved to UD Almería, and made his senior debut with the reserves on 29 October 2017 by coming on as a late substitute in a 0–1 Tercera División away loss against Atarfe Industrial CF.

On 12 July 2018, García joined Real Betis; initially assigned to the Juvenil A squad, he appeared regularly with the B-team also in the fourth division during the campaign, scoring 15 goals. He made his first team – and La Liga – debut on 24 September of the following year, replacing Borja Iglesias late into a 3–1 home success over Levante UD.

On 7 March 2022, García renewed his contract with Betis until 2025. On 28 June, he was loaned to Segunda División side CD Mirandés for the season.

García scored his first professional goal on 13 August 2022, in a 2–2 home draw against Sporting de Gijón; it was also his debut for Mirandés. In December, he scored three times in three matches (including a brace in a 2–1 home win over SD Ponferradina), as the club remained undefeated during the entire month.

Honours
Betis
Copa del Rey: 2021–22

References

External links
 Real Betis profile
 
 
 

2000 births
Living people
People from Baix Llobregat
Sportspeople from the Province of Barcelona
Spanish footballers
Footballers from Catalonia
Association football forwards
La Liga players
Primera Federación players
Segunda División B players
Tercera División players
UD Almería B players
Betis Deportivo Balompié footballers
Real Betis players
CD Mirandés footballers